The Sauber C14 was the Formula One car with which the Sauber team competed in the 1995 Formula One World Championship. The number 29 seat was initially taken by Austrian driver Karl Wendlinger, while the number 30 seat was taken by Germany's Heinz-Harald Frentzen. However, Wendlinger underperformed and was replaced by Frenchman Jean-Christophe Boullion for most of the remainder of the year. The team's test driver was Argentine Norberto Fontana. The car was powered by a Ford ECA Zetec-R 3.0 V8 engine and ran on Petronas fuel from the 1995 Monaco Grand Prix onwards. The team's main sponsor was Red Bull.

The car was launched and raced in the season's early races with a distinctive narrow and drooping nose.  At the San Marino GP, this was replaced by a more conventional raised nose carrying the front wing underneath on twin supports. Thus the car became a largely unremarkable mid-1990s F1 midfielder, although it was notable for being the only 1995 F1 car to feature the raised cockpit sides which would be mandated from 1996, and for achieving Sauber's first F1 podium finish with Frentzen 3rd in Italy.

Complete Formula One results
(key)

References

External links

1995 Formula One season cars
C14